Halford is a village and civil parish about  north of Shipston-on-Stour in Warwickshire, England. The village is where the Fosse Way Roman road (now the A429 road) crosses the River Stour. The 2011 Census recorded the parish's population as 341. By the river are the earthworks and buried remains of Halford Castle, a motte castle believed to be the predecessor of the present manor house.

References

External links

Halford Parish Council
The Stourdene Benefice
Halford Village Website

Civil parishes in Warwickshire
Villages in Warwickshire